The Webb Schools is the collective name for two private schools for grades 9-12, founded by Thompson Webb, located in Claremont, California. The Webb School of California for boys was established in 1922, and the Vivian Webb School for girls in 1981. Both are primarily boarding schools, but they also enroll a limited number of day students. The Raymond M. Alf Museum of Paleontology is a part of The Webb Schools.

In 2018, Webb purchased undeveloped land next to the existing campus and will now preserve the hillside and create a buffer between the campus and suburban development. There are 410 students and 57 faculty members, of which 25% hold doctorates, 80% hold advanced degrees and 74% live on campus (as of the 2018-2019 school year). Annual tuition (as of the 2019-2020 school year) is $66,130 for boarding students and $47,035 for day students, including meals, books, and fees. For the 2019–20 school year, Webb offered $5.5 million in need-based aid to 35 percent of the families, with awards ranging from several thousand dollars to nearly the full cost of tuition.

The majority of ninth- and tenth-grade classes are taught in a single-sex environment. Co-educational courses are introduced to upperclassmen.

The official student newspaper of The Webb Schools is the Webb Canyon Chronicle.

History
The Webb School's founder, Thompson Webb, was born in 1887 as the youngest of eight children. His father, William Robert “Sawney” Webb, had established the Webb School in Tennessee in 1870. Thompson graduated from his father's school in 1907, and continued his education at the University of North Carolina, graduating in 1911.

After college, Webb's health and the suggestions of doctors led him to move west to a warmer climate. He moved to the California desert near Indio, worked as a farm hand, and eventually bought his own piece of land and started a career as a farmer. He married Vivian Howell, the 20-year-old daughter of a Los Angeles Methodist minister, on June 22, 1915. She joined him in farming. The Webbs farmed together and increased their holdings until 1918, when a diseased onion crop wiped out all their savings.  Broke and carrying high debt, Webb did not have the capital to farm and, because the country was involved in World War I, he was unable to sell his land.

Webb returned to Tennessee, where his father's school was experiencing a shortage of male teachers (due to the war) that threatened the school's existence. Thompson Webb worked as an instructor at the school in Bell Buckle, Tennessee for four years, after which he returned to California to open his own private residential school. The first suggestion that Thompson Webb start a school in California came from Sherman Day Thacher, founder of the Thacher School in Ojai Valley. Thacher told Webb that his school was turning down dozens of qualified students every year and that an empty school near Claremont was for sale. If Thompson opened a school there, Thacher agreed to refer his applicants. Through a proposal to I.W. Baughman, real estate broker for the Claremont property, Thompson Webb struck a deal that got him his school in 1922.

Initial enrollment at the school was 14 boys. Over the years Webb built the school through the support of many influential business leaders in the greater Los Angeles community, including the Chandlers, Guggenheims, Boeings, and many others. As the number of students grew in the ’30s and ’40s, Webb added seven major buildings, five faculty homes, and two smaller structures to the campus. Two of Webb’s landmark buildings were constructed during this time: the Thomas Jackson Library and the Vivian Webb Chapel.

The school operated as a family-owned stock company until the late 1950s, when the Webb family turned it over to a non-profit corporation. After the non-profit corporation was established, Thompson Webb continued as headmaster of the school and Vivian Webb as general  until their retirements in 1962. Vivian Webb died in 1971; her husband died four years later in 1975.

The concept of a girls’ school on the Webb campus first came up for discussion in the early 1980s. After the private Girls Collegiate High School in Claremont closed, a group of Claremont parents led a campaign and persuaded the board of trustees to establish a girls’ school on the Webb campus.  Vivian Webb School opened in the fall of 1981, with 34 girls as day students. Four years later, Vivian Webb School admitted girls as boarding students for the first time.

Campus
The school's  sit on a heavily planted hillside. The lower part of campus contains the "plaza group," consisting of the Raymond M. Alf Museum of Paleontology, the W. Russell Fawcett Library, classrooms, the Susan A. Nelson Performing Arts Center, the Price Dining Hall, the administration building, the Copeland Donahue Theater, and the Frederick R. Hooper Student Center. One original building remains: a clapboard structure built in 1917, called the "Old School House," now home to the foreign language department. East of the plaza group is the house that the Webb family occupied for years, a girl's dormitory, and the Thomas Jackson Library.

Up the hillside are dormitories, the Barbara Mott McCarthy Aquatics Center, and Chandler Field, one of four large playing fields. Further up the hill are the health center, the Vivian Webb Chapel (which sits atop its own knoll), additional dormitories, tennis courts, and faculty houses. At the top of the hill are a cross-country track course, the Les Perry Gymnasium, McCarthy Fitness Center, and Faculty Field at the Mary Stuart Rogers Sports Center. South of the football field is a fully functional astronomical observatory. Behind the Faculty Field the Webb property extends into the San Gabriel Mountains. The cross-country course goes through this part of the property.

Raymond M. Alf Museum of Paleontology

Webb is the only high school in the United States with a nationally accredited museum, and the only high school in the world with a paleontology museum on campus. The Raymond M. Alf Museum of Paleontology is named for long-time Webb science teacher Raymond M. Alf (1905–1999). In the late 1930s, Alf and several students found a fossil skull in the Mojave Desert in the Barstow area. This discovery of a new species of Miocene-age peccary, Dyseohyus fricki, inspired additional fossil-hunting trips in the western United States with student groups.

Alf continued his pursuit of paleontology by earning his master's degree from the University of Colorado. The fossil hunting continued when Alf returned to Webb and he subsequently created a small museum in the basement of Jackson Library to house his collection of thousands of fossils. As the collection eventually outgrew the shelves in Alf's classroom and the library basement, the museum moved to its own campus building in 1968. Today the museum is professionally curated by Dr. Donald "Doc" Lofgren, and is accredited by the American Alliance of Museums. The museum features one of the largest collections of fossil animal footprints in the world, including the original peccary skull found in 1937. The Alf Museum continues to sponsor paleontology field excursions over the summers and has contributed to the discovery of new species like Gryposaurus monumentensis, in the Grand Staircase–Escalante National Monument in southern Utah. The fossils were removed and identified in collaboration with the University of Utah and the national monument.

The latest in the museum's impressive discoveries includes "Joe," the baby Parasaurolophus. The dinosaur's 75 million-year-old fossilized remains were found by Webb student, Kevin M. Terris, in the summer of 2009. It took three years to completely excavate "Joe" from a ridge deep in the Grand Staircase–Escalante National Monument in Utah, including a helicopter lift out of the region. This extremely rare and important discovery provides groundbreaking information on how Parasaurlophus grew up. This is just one of the countless examples of how Webb students have contributed to the field of paleontology.

Vivian Webb Chapel

Fascinated by California missions, Thompson Webb took the mission at San Juan Capistrano as the inspiration for the Vivian Webb Chapel, a monument to both his religious faith and his love for his wife. In 1937, with the help of a small cement mixer and two hired workers, Thompson began making  adobe bricks. After a year of turning out more than 10,000 mission-style bricks and drying them in the sun on the school's tennis courts, he began building the chapel's foundation in 1938, and laid the chapel's first brick in 1939. He built the walls of the chapel with the help of students, parents, visitors, prospective students and even the governor of Tennessee.

Near completion of the structure, Webb learned that sculptor Alec Miller was in the United States because of World War II, and lacked the funds to return to his native Scotland. Miller was well known in England because of his carvings for the cathedral at Coventry. Webb hired the artist at a modest fee, plus room and board, to design the furnishings (Miller called them “fitments”) for the chapel. Miller lived with the Webbs for three years while he designed the chapel's “fitments” and the insets for the chapel's entrance doors. The chapel was completed in 1944; the bell tower was added later.

Thomas Jackson Library

The parents of Thomas Jackson donated the Thomas Jackson Library to the school as a memorial to their son, who graduated from Webb in 1930 but died of a heart attack while in his sophomore year at the California Institute of Technology. The library, dedicated in 1938, was designed by acclaimed architect Myron Hunt, who also built the Rose Bowl, the Pasadena main library, and Thompson and Vivian Webb's campus home. The building, in a Mediterranean style with small balconies on the second floor and a mezzanine balcony around the interior, won an Honor Award from the American Institute of Architects soon after its dedication. From 1937 to 1948, Vivian Webb helped each graduating senior design and carve a wooden plaque bearing his name, his graduating year and some symbol of his interest. These plaques line the library's walls. On the library's heavy oak doors, Vivian Webb herself carved the names of the 158 boys who graduated before 1937. The library is now used as a formal reception room.

Notable alumni

 Michael Arias, Anime producer
 Robert D. Arnott, founder of Research Affiliates
 Alphonzo E. Bell Jr., member of the U.S. House of Representatives
 Tyler Bensinger, writer and TV producer
 Paul Billings, geneticist
 William E. Boeing Jr., philanthropist
 Art Clokey, creator of Gumby
 John R. Davis Jr., American diplomat
 Leslie Epstein, Rhodes Scholar, novelist, playwright
 Roger Fan, actor
 Brooks Firestone, winemaker and politician, of the Firestone Tires family
 Maame Ewusi-Mensah Frimpong, Judge on the United States District Court for the Central District of California
 Robert Glenn Ketchum, photographer
 Jeff Luhnow, Houston Astros General Manager 
 E. Pierce Marshall, businessman
 Josh Marshall, journalist, blogger, and publisher of Talking Points Memo
 Malcolm McKenna, paleontologist, former curator at the American Museum of Natural History
 Seeley Mudd, physician, professor, and philanthropist to academic institutions
 Nils Muiznieks, Latvian human rights activist and political scientist
 Steven Nissen, cardiologist
 Jeffrey Pfeffer, author, lecturer
 Sandra Lee, M.D., dermatologist, known as Dr. Pimple Popper, social media influencer and television star
 David Lee Roth, rock and roll singer
 Jordan Ryan, vice-president for Peace Programs, The Carter Center
 Newton Russell, California State Assemblyman
 David Sanger, Asleep at the Wheel band member
 John Scalzi, science fiction author
 Charles Scripps, chairman of E.W. Scripps Company
 Admiral James Watkins, 22nd Chief of Naval Operations and United States Secretary of Energy
 Nick Wechsler, movie producer (The Time Traveler's Wife, North Country)

Related schools
The original Webb School founded by Thompson Webb's father still operates in Tennessee. A son of Thompson and Vivian Webb, Howell Webb, founded the Foothill Country Day School in Claremont in 1954. A nephew, Robert Webb, started the Webb School of Knoxville in Tennessee in 1955.

See also
 Raymond M. Alf Museum of Paleontology
 Webb School (Bell Buckle, Tennessee)
 Webb School of Knoxville

References

External links
 Official website
 Raymond M. Alf Museum of Paleontology
 The Association of Boarding Schools: Webb Schools profile

Boarding schools in California
Boys' schools in the United States
Girls' schools in California
High schools in Los Angeles County, California
Private high schools in California
Educational institutions established in 1922
1922 establishments in California
Claremont, California